Alfonso, Prince of Asturias may refer to:

 Alfonso, Prince of Asturias (1453–1468), son of John II of Castile and Isabella of Portugal
 Alfonso XII of Spain (1857–1885), son of Isabella II of Spain and Francis, Duke of Cádiz
 Alfonso, Prince of Asturias (1907–1938), son of Alfonso XIII of Spain and Victoria Eugenie of Battenberg